Spur 327 is a short freeway located in the southwestern part of Lubbock, Texas. The highway connects U.S. Highway 62/U.S. Highway 82 (US 62/US 82, Marsha Sharp Freeway) to Loop 289.

Route description
Spur 327 begins at an incomplete interchange with US 62/US 82 (Marsha Sharp Freeway) in southwest Lubbock. The highway has an exit with Milwaukee Avenue, then passes over Frankford Avenue without any direct access. Spur 327 ends at an interchange with Loop 289 just west of Slide Road.

History
Spur 327 originally opened to traffic on October 30, 1957, and its original routing has not changed since then. The Texas Department of Transportation (TxDOT) began upgrading it to a freeway in early 2015, with overhead signs placed in early August. The freeway upgrade is part of phase 5A of the Marsha Sharp Freeway extension to Wolfforth.

Exit list

See also

References

327
Transportation in Lubbock, Texas
Freeways in Texas
Transportation in Lubbock County, Texas